Brad F. Grinter (May 18, 1922 – April 1993) was an American film director, actor, producer, and screenwriter who is best known for the 1972 cult classic horror film Blood Freak. He also directed the 1970 film Flesh Feast, which stars Veronica Lake in her last film appearance. Brad had two children His son, Randy Grinter was a cameraman and had worked on a number of films. His daughter,  Lorrie Vickers, found by dna, at 57 years old in 2021 is still living in Midland, texas.

Brad Grinter died in April 1993, in Miami, Florida, at the age of 71.
Brad's son Randy died November 16, 2018, at the age of 69 in Gainesville, Florida, from complications related to dementia.

References

External links
 

1922 births
1993 deaths
American male film actors
American film producers
American male screenwriters
People from Illinois
Film directors from Illinois
Horror film directors
20th-century American male actors
20th-century American businesspeople
20th-century American male writers
20th-century American screenwriters